Colonel John W. Avery, (April 2, 1814March 24, 1891) was a well-known merchant from Brooklyn, New York who was in business there for over fifty years. He volunteered during the American Civil War to join the Union Army. He became a respected Union officer, reaching the rank of  lieutenant colonel. He is best known for being an aid at the funeral for United States president Zachary Taylor and as one of the first Wholesale Grocer in New York City.

Early life

Avery was born on Water Street, New York City on April 2, 1814. He married Sarah Banning (1794-1886) in 1831, who was from Reading, Berkshire, England. Avery lived at 127 Hooper Street in Brooklyn, New York for over forty years and had four sons with his wife.

Career

New York National Guard

Avery was a well-known national guardsman commissioned as a  colonel, of the 8th Regiment, New York State Militia (NYSM). 

On July 23, 1850, Avery was appointed special aid under the command of Captain Joshua A. Varian for General William Hall, who was Grand marshal, during the New York City funeral in honor of the late Zachary Taylor, 12th president of the United States. Avery was in the troop of cavalry in the First Division at the procession that moved from the Park and proceeded down Broadway, to Chatham Street to the Bowery; down to Union Square; and then in front of the  City Hall.

American Civil War

At the beginning of the American Civil War, Avery was a commissioned  lieutenant colonel who commanded the 8th Regiment National Guard Infantry (formerly the 8th Regiment, New York State Militia), known during the civil war as the "Washington Greys," Brooklyn, New York. He served from 1861 to 1863.

On April 25, 1865, after Abraham Lincoln, 16th president of the United States was assassinated, Colonel Avery was again appointed as special aid under the command of Captain Smith for Brigadier general Hall, who was Grand marshal, during the New York City funeral procession. Avery was in the troop of cavalry in the First Brigade, during the procession, which moved from City Hall to Broadway to Fourteenth-street; to Fifth-avenue; to Thirty-fourth-street; to Ninth-avenue, to the Hudson River Railroad Depot.

John W. Avery & Co.

After the war, Avery started the John W. Avery & Co., a ship stores and general grocery buienss at 309 Water Street, New York City. He was a well-known merchant among the local Sandy Hook pilots. The store on Water Street had been for 40 years the regular "headquarters" for New York Sandy Hook pilots. At almost any time, up to a dozen of the pilots could be found lounging around there and exchanging stories of recent sailing adventures. Avery knew Captain Joseph Henderson for 40 years and Captain  James Callahan for 30 years. He was collector and disburser for many pilots, collecting and disbursing their earnings. They would settle their accounts before they went to sea. 

Avery would often put ads in the local newspaper on behalf of the Sandy Hook pilots. For example, on February 7, 1863, Avery put an ad in the New York Daily Herald saying that a 16 foot yawl was lost or stolen from the pilot boat James M. Waterbury. The yawl was painted brown on the outside and yellow on the inside, with the name of "David Blackburn" branded on her. A reward for $10 was offered for her recovery. You would then reply to John W. Avery, 309 Water Street.

On February 26, 1874, Colonel Avery, of 309 Water Street, contributed 200 loaves of bread for the poor at the soup kitchen at Water Street of the Fourth Ward in Brooklyn.

Alabama Claims

During Alabama Claims in Joseph Henderson v. United States and James Callahan v. United States, for compensation of their loss of the pilot boat  William Bell during the Civil War, Avery gave a deposition on February 24, 1883. He knew both Henderson and Callahan for over thirty years and stated that he was 69 years old, living in New York. His occupation was in the general grocery and ship stores business. He was a collector and disburser for Henderson and Callahan and other Sandy Hook pilots. He paid the entire cost of the William Bell and submitted receipts for examination to the counsel. On June 5, 1883, the final award gave compensation of $9,289.59 to Henderson, who owned 5/16 shares in the William Bell and James Callahan, $9,410.14, who owned 5/16 shares, for a total award of $18,699.73. Although, this was less than the $24,000.00 amount claimed, it was a reasonable settlement.

Memberships
Avery was a member of the John D. Williard Lodge, F. & A.M.; of Knickerbocker Lodge, I.O.O.F., and of the New York and New Jersey Sandy Hook pilots' association.

Death

Colonel Avery died at his home, 127 Hooper Street, on March 24, 1891, in Brooklyn, New York, at the age of 76. He is interred at Green-wood Cemetery in Brooklyn, New York. His last Will and Testament was filed at the Kings County Superior Court, New York on April 20, 1891. His four sons died before him and only heirs were John W. Avery, Jr., a grandson, who resided at 127 Hooper Street in Brooklyn and four other grandsons.

References

1814 births
1891 deaths
Businesspeople from Brooklyn
People of New York (state) in the American Civil War
Burials at Green-Wood Cemetery
American people of English descent
19th-century American businesspeople